The Xiaoyan Formation is a geological formation in Anhui, China whose strata date back to the Late Cretaceous. Dinosaur remains are among the fossils that have been recovered from the formation. It overlies the older Qiyunshan Formation which it forms the Huangshan Basin with, and was deposited between the Campanian and Maastrichtian stages.

Vertebrate paleofauna
 Wannanosaurus yansiensis - "Partial skull roof, mandible, fragments of postcranium."

See also

 List of dinosaur-bearing rock formations

References

Geologic formations of China
Upper Cretaceous Series of Asia
Cretaceous China
Maastrichtian Stage
Paleontology in Guangdong